Graham Gaunt (born 2 August 1953) is a former Australian rules footballer who played with Richmond and Melbourne in the Victorian Football League (VFL).

Notes

External links 

1953 births
Living people
Australian rules footballers from Victoria (Australia)
Richmond Football Club players
Melbourne Football Club players